Louise Beavers (March 8, 1902 – October 26, 1962) was an American film and television actress. From the 1920s until 1960, she appeared in dozens of films and two hit television shows.  She was most often cast in the roles of a maid, servant or slave.

Early life
Beavers was born in Cincinnati, Ohio, to school teacher Ernestine (Monroe) Beavers and William M. Beavers, who was originally from Georgia. Due to her mother's illness, Louise and her parents moved to Pasadena, California.

In Pasadena, she attended school and engaged in several after-school activities, such as basketball and church choir. Her mother also worked as a voice teacher and taught Louise how to sing for concerts. In June 1920, she graduated from Pasadena High School. She worked as a dressing room attendant for a photographer and served as a personal maid to film star Leatrice Joy.

Like her cousin, Golden State Mutual Life Insurance Company co-founder, George Beavers, Jr., Louise Beavers was a prominent and active member of the African American community in Los Angeles. She was involved in community functions, from the People’s Independent Church, where she helped develop the theater program of the Young People’s Lyceum, to the 1939 public ceremonies celebrating development of the all-black resort, Val Verde County Park.

She was in a group called the Lady Minstrels, a group of young women who staged amateur productions and appeared on stage at the Loews State Theatre. Either her career began with her performance in the Lady Minstrels or in a contest at the Philharmonic Auditorium, which occurred later. Charles Butler from the Central Casting Bureau, who was known for being an agent for African American actors, saw the performance and recommended that Beavers try for a role for a movie. 

At first she was hesitant to try out for movies because of how African Americans were portrayed in movies and how Hollywood encouraged these roles. She once said, "In all the pictures I had seen… they never used colored people for anything except savages." Despite this, she tried out for a part in the film Uncle Tom's Cabin (1927), and won the part.

Career
Beavers started her career in the 1920s. At the time, black people in films were limited to acting in only very few roles, usually as slaves or domestic help. She played the "mammy" in many of the movies in which she acted. She started to gain more attention in the acting world after she played the role of Julia in Coquette (1929), which starred Mary Pickford. In this film, she played the black maid and mother figure to a young white woman.

She once received a review which stated, "Personally, Miss Beavers is just splendid, just as fine as she appears on screen, but she also has a charm all her own, which needs no screen role for recognition. She has a very pleasing personality, one that draws people to her instantly and makes them feel that they are meeting a friend instead of a Hollywood Star."

Beavers often played roles in which she helps a white protagonist mature in the course of the movie. 

Beavers played Delilah in Imitation of Life (1934) in a dramatic role. Her character again plays a black housekeeper, but instead of the usual stereotypical comedic or purely functional role, Delilah's story line is a secondary parallel plot. The public reacted positively to Beavers's performance. It was not only a breakthrough for Beavers, but was also "the first time in American cinema history that a black woman's problems were given major emotional weight in a major Hollywood motion picture". Some in the media recognized the unfairness of Hollywood's double standard regarding race. A contributor to California Graphic Magazine wrote: "the Academy could not recognize Miss Beavers. She is black!"

She played the lead role in the film Reform School (1939), once thought to be lost, in which she portrayed a professional authority figure: a forward-thinking probation officer who becomes the superintendent of a reform school and implements major changes.

In the motion picture Holiday Inn (1942), in a celebration for Lincoln's Birthday, there was a big minstrel show number, "Abraham," which featured musical performances by Beavers as Mamie and Bing Crosby as Jim Hardy (who performs in traditional blackface makeup). This number, as well as the scene itself, are sometimes cut from the film's showings on television.

Beavers, who was raised in the North and in California, had to learn to speak the Southern Negro dialect. As Beavers's career grew, some criticized her for the roles she accepted, alleging that such roles institutionalized the view that blacks were subservient to whites.  Beavers dismissed the criticism. She acknowledged the limited opportunities available, but said: "I am only playing the parts. I don't live them." As she became better known, Beavers began to speak against Hollywood's portrayal and treatment of African Americans, both during production and after promoting the films. Beavers became active in public life, seeking to help support African Americans. She endorsed Robert S. Abbott, the editor of The Chicago Defender, who fought for African Americans' civil rights. She supported Richard Nixon, who she believed would help black Americans in the United States in the civil rights battle.

Beavers was one of three actresses (including Hattie McDaniel and Ethel Waters) to portray housekeeper Beulah on the Beulah television show. That show was the first television sitcom to star a black person. She also played a maid, Louise, for the first two seasons of The Danny Thomas Show (1953–1955).

Marriage
Beavers married Robert Clark in 1936. He later became her manager. She not only worked in movies, but also on "twenty-week tours of theaters that she conducted annually". Beavers and Clark later divorced and remarried. Much later, in 1952, Beavers married Leroy Moore, who was either an interior designer or a chef (varying sources); they remained married until her death in 1962. She had no children.

Death
In later life, Beavers was plagued by health issues, including diabetes. She died on October 26, 1962, at the age of 60, following a heart attack, at Cedars of Lebanon Hospital in Los Angeles.

Honors
Beavers was inducted into the Black Filmmakers Hall of Fame in 1976.
Beavers was an honorary member of Sigma Gamma Rho sorority, one of the four African American sororities.

Filmography
Features

 Uncle Tom's Cabin (1927) as Slave at Wedding (uncredited)
 Coquette (1929) as Julia
 Glad Rag Doll (1929) as Hannah
 Gold Diggers of Broadway (1929) as Sadie the Maid
 Barnum Was Right (1929) as Maid (uncredited)
 Wall Street (1929) as Magnolia
 Nix on Dames (1929) as Magnolia
 Second Choice (1930) as Maid (uncredited)
 Wide Open (1930) as Easter
 She Couldn't Say No (1930) as Cora
 Honey (1930) as Black Revivalist (uncredited)
 True to the Navy (1930) as Maid (uncredited)
 Safety in Numbers (1930) as Messalina
 Back Pay (1930) as Nellie - Hester's Maid (uncredited)
 Recaptured Love (1930) as Maid (uncredited)
 Our Blushing Brides (1930) as Amelia - the Mannequins' Maid (uncredited)
 Manslaughter (1930) as Rose (prison inmate) (uncredited)
 Outside the Law (1930) as Judy the Maid (uncredited)
 Bright Lights (1930) as Angela - the Maid (uncredited)
 Paid (1930) as Black Convict (uncredited)
 Scandal Sheet (1931)
 Millie (1931) as Maid (uncredited)
 Don't Bet on Women (1931) as Maid (uncredited)
 Six Cylinder Love (1931) as Bit Role (uncredited)
 Party Husband (1931) as Laura's Maid (uncredited)
 Annabelle's Affairs (1931) as Ruby
 Sundown Trail (1931) as Auntie Jenny
 Reckless Living (1931) as Maid
 Girls About Town (1931) as Hattie
 Good Sport (1931) as September
 Ladies of the Big House (1931) as Ivory
 The Greeks Had a Word for Them (1932) as Beautician (uncredited)
 The Expert (1932) as Lulu
 It's Tough to Be Famous (1932) as Ada, Janet's Maid
 Young America (1932) as Maid (uncredited)
 Night World (1932) as Maid (uncredited)
 The Strange Love of Molly Louvain (1932) as Washroom Attendant (uncredited)
 Street of Women (1932) as Mattie, Natalie's maid
 The Dark Horse (1932) as Levinnia, Kay's Maid (uncredited)
 What Price Hollywood? (1932) as The Maid
 Unashamed (1932) as Amanda Jones
 Divorce in the Family (1932) as Rosetta
 Hell's Highway (1932) as Rascal's Sweetheart at Visitor's Center (uncredited)
 Wild Girl (1932) as Mammy Lou (uncredited)
 Too Busy To Work (1932) as Mammy
 She Done Him Wrong (1933) as Pearl
 Her Splendid Folly (1933) as Anastasia
 42nd Street (1933) as Pansy - Dorothy's Maid (uncredited)
 Girl Missing (1933) as Julie - Daisy's Maid (uncredited)
 The Phantom Broadcast (1933) as Penny (uncredited)
 Pick-Up (1933) as Magnolia (uncredited)
 Central Airport (1933) as Hotel Maid (uncredited)
 The Big Cage (1933) as Mandy (uncredited)
 The Story of Temple Drake (1933) as Minnie
 What Price Innocence? (1933) as Hannah
 Hold Your Man (1933) as Elite Club Attendant (uncredited)
 Midnight Mary (1933) as Anna - Mary's Maid (uncredited)
 Her Bodyguard (1933) as Margot's Maid
 A Shriek in the Night (1933) as Maid
 Notorious But Nice (1933) as Ophelia (uncredited)
 Bombshell (1933) as Loretta
 Only Yesterday (1933) as Abby, the Emerson's Maid (uncredited)
 In the Money  (1933) as Lily
 Jimmy and Sally (1933) as Maid (uncredited)
 Palooka (1934) as Crystal
 Bedside (1934) as Pansy
 I've Got Your Number (1934) as Crystal
 Gambling Lady (1934) as Suzy - Peter's Cook (uncredited)
 A Modern Hero (1934) as Azais' Maid (uncredited)
 The Woman Condemned (1934) as Sally - Jane's Maid
 Registered Nurse (1934) as Flo - Sadie's Maid (uncredited)
 Glamour (1934) as Millie
 I Believed in You (1934) as Prisoner (uncredited)
 Merry Wives of Reno (1934) as Derwent's Client - Black Mother of 12 Wanting a Divorce (uncredited)
 Cheaters (1934) as Lily
 The Merry Frinks (1934) as Camille, Hattie's Maid
 Dr. Monica (1934) as Sarah - Mary's Maid (uncredited)
 I Give My Love (1934) as Maid
 Beggar's Holiday (1934) as Heliotrope
 Imitation of Life (1934) as Delilah Johnson
 West of the Pecos (1934) as Mauree
 Million Dollar Baby (1934) as Black Mother
 Annapolis Farewell (1935) as Miranda
 Bullets or Ballots (1936) as Nellie LaFleur
 Wives Never Know (1936) as Florabelle
 General Spanky (1936) as Cornelia
 Rainbow on the River (1936) as Toinette
 Make Way for Tomorrow (1937) as Mamie
 Wings Over Honolulu (1937) as Mammy
 Love in a Bungalow (1937) as Millie
 The Last Gangster (1937) as Gloria
 Scandal Street (1938) as Clairce
 Life Goes On (1938) as Sally Weston
 Brother Rat (1938) as Jenny
 The Headleys at Home (1938) as Hyacinth
 Peck's Bad Boy with the Circus (1938) as Cassey
 Made for Each Other (1939) as Lily - Cook #3 (uncredited)
 The Lady's from Kentucky (1939) as Aunt Tina
 Reform School (1939) as Mother Barton
 Parole Fixer (1940) as Aunt Lindy
 Women Without Names (1940) as Ivory
 Primrose Path (1940) as Woman Talking to Police (uncredited)
 I Want a Divorce (1940) as Celestine
 No Time for Comedy (1940) as Clementine
 Virginia (1941) as Ophelia
 Sign of the Wolf (1941) as Beulah
 Kisses for Breakfast (1941) as Clotilda
 Belle Starr (1941) as Mammy Lou
 Shadow of the Thin Man (1941) as Stella
 The Vanishing Virginian (1942) as Aunt Emmeline
 Young America (1942) as Pansy
 Reap the Wild Wind (1942) as Maum Maria
 Holiday Inn (1942) as Mamie
 The Big Street (1942) as Ruby - Gloria's Maid (uncredited)
 Seven Sweethearts (1942) as Petunia, the Maid
 Tennessee Johnson (1942) as Addie (uncredited)
 Good Morning, Judge (1943) as Cleo
 DuBarry Was a Lady (1943) as Niagara
 All by Myself (1943) as Willie
 Top Man (1943) as Cleo - the Warrens' Maid
 Jack London (1943) as Mammy Jenny
 There's Something About a Soldier (1943) as Birdie (uncredited)
 Follow the Boys (1944) as Louise Beavers (uncredited)
 South of Dixie (1944) as Magnolia Brown / Chloe
 Dixie Jamboree (1944) as Opal
 Barbary Coast Gent (1944) as Bedelia
 Delightfully Dangerous (1945) as Hannah
 Young Widow (1946) as Rosie, the Cook (uncredited)
 Lover Come Back (1946) as Martha, Kay's Maid
 Banjo (1947) as Lindy
 Mr. Blandings Builds His Dream House (1948) as Gussie
 A Southern Yankee (1948) as Laundry Woman (uncredited)
 For the Love of Mary (1948) as Bertha
 Good Sam (1948) as Chloe
 Tell It to the Judge (1949) as Cleo, Marsha's Maid (uncredited)
 Girls' School (1950) as Hattie
 The Jackie Robinson Story (1950) as Jackie's Mother
 My Blue Heaven (1950) as Selma
 Colorado Sundown (1952) as Mattie - Jackie's Maid
 I Dream of Jeanie (1952) as Mammy
 Never Wave at a WAC (1953) as Artamesa, Jo's Maid
 Good-bye, My Lady (1956) as Bonnie Drew
 You Can't Run Away from It (1956) as Maid
 Teenage Rebel (1956) as Willamay
 Tammy and the Bachelor (1957) as Osia
 The Goddess (1958) as The Cook
 All the Fine Young Cannibals (1960) as Rose
 The Facts of Life (1960) as Gussie

Short subjects
 Oriental Hugs (1928)
 Election Day (1929) as Farina's Mother
 Knights Before Christmas (1930)
 You're Telling Me (1932) as The Maid (uncredited)
 Hesitating Love (1932)
 The Midnight Patrol (1933) (scenes deleted)
 Grin and Bear It (1933)

References

Further reading

External links

 
 
 

1900 births
1962 deaths
Actresses from Cincinnati
African-American actresses
American silent film actresses
20th-century American actresses
Actresses from Pasadena, California
American television actresses
American film actresses
Burials at Evergreen Cemetery, Los Angeles
Ohio Republicans
Pasadena High School (California) alumni
20th-century African-American women
20th-century African-American people